They Call Me Hallelujah (also known as Guns for Dollars, Deep West and Heads I Kill You, Tails You're Dead! They Call Me Hallalujah) is a 1971 Italian Spaghetti Western film directed by Giuliano Carnimeo and starring George Hilton. The film spawned a 1972 sequel, Return of Hallelujah, also directed by Carnimeo and starring many of the same actors as in the original.

Plot

In tumultuous Mexico in the 1860s a band of revolutionaries led by General Ramirez plan to use the jewelry in the possession of the oppressive governing forces to finance their armed struggle. They hire Hallelujah, an American gunfighter, to steal the jewelry for them. He succeeds, but the jewelry turns out to be fake. Hallelujah goes off in pursuit of the real jewels. Also after it is a mysterious nun, a flamboyant Russian nobleman, and assorted bandits, soldiers and townspeople.

Cast 

  George Hilton as  Hallelujah
Charles Southwood as Alexi 
Agata Flori as Sister Anna Lee 
Robert Camardiel as Gen. Emiliano Ramirez 
Rick Boyd as  Duke Slocum
Paolo Gozlino as  Fortune 
Andrea Bosic as  Krantz 
Linda Sini as Gertrude 
Aldo Barberito as  The Priest
Franco Pesce as Ebeneezer 
Ugo Adinolfi as  Pablito 
Fortunato Arena as The Sheriff
Furio Meniconi as Glock

See also 
 List of Italian films of 1971

References

External links

Spaghetti Western films
1971 Western (genre) films
1971 films
Films directed by Giuliano Carnimeo
Films scored by Stelvio Cipriani
1970s Italian-language films
1970s Italian films